Carl Meyer (born 3 September 1981 in Geraldine, New Zealand) is a New Zealand rower. He is married to double Olympic gold medallist Caroline Evers-Swindell.

References

References 
 
 
 

1981 births
Living people
New Zealand male rowers
Olympic rowers of New Zealand
Rowers at the 2004 Summer Olympics
Rowers at the 2008 Summer Olympics
People from Geraldine, New Zealand
World Rowing Championships medalists for New Zealand
Sportspeople from Canterbury, New Zealand